Girls on Top is the fifth Korean studio album by South Korean singer BoA, released on June 24, 2005, by her native label SM Entertainment. Under the repackaged title Moto, the album was re-released on August 25, 2005, to promote the titular track, while including a previous unreleased track, and later on March 26, 2008, in Japan as a special edition (along with her previous Korean release My Name). It was, at the time, the singer's last release in her native country for over five years, until the release of Hurricane Venus in August 2010.

To promote the album, "Girls on Top" and "Moto" were released as singles from the album. Similar to her previous Korean release, the album also received an oversea version, including a Mandarin version of the eponymous lead single, "Girls on Top". An English version of the title track is on BoA's debut English studio album, BoA (2009).

Reception
Peaking at number three on the monthly domestic Music Industry Association of Korea ranking list, Girls on Top was a commercial success, having sold a total of 115,000 copies in 2005.

Accolades

Track listing

Charts

Weekly charts

Monthly charts

Year-end charts

References

2005 albums
BoA albums
SM Entertainment albums
Korean-language albums